Leishbunyaviridae is a family of negative-strand RNA viruses belonging to the Bunyavirales order, which infect protozoans. It only contains one recognized genus Shilevirus. But another genus Leishbunyavirus has also been proposed.

References 

Bunyavirales
Virus families